John Williams Campbell (1880–1957) was a millionaire American financier and railroad executive. He kept an office at Grand Central Terminal in New York City, which was later converted into a bar called the Campbell Apartment, a popular gathering spot for commuters and others after work.

Biography

Campbell was the son of John H. Campbell, the treasurer of Credit Clearing House, a credit-reference firm specializing in the garment industry. The younger Campbell had two sisters and an older brother. The family lived on Cumberland Street, in the affluent Brooklyn neighborhood known as The Hill, now called Fort Greene.

Having never attended college, Campbell started work at 18 at his father’s firm, where he became a senior executive at 25 and later president and chairman. In 1941, Credit Clearing House merged with Dun & Bradstreet.

He married the former Rosalind D. Casanave, nicknamed Princess, who was once listed in The New York Times as a "patroness" of a "Monte Carlo party and dance" at the Westchester Country Club.

In 1920, at the age of 40, Campbell was appointed to the board of New York Central Railroad, where he crossed paths with William Kissam Vanderbilt II, the railroad scion whose office was in Grand Central Terminal. It is probable that Vanderbilt showed Campbell the space. Campbell became chairman of the board of the Hudson and Manhattan Railroad, keeping the position until he died in 1957.

Office in Grand Central

Like other successful tycoons of the day, Campbell demanded a grand office, one convenient to his clients and close to the railroad so he could commute, first from a nearby apartment at 270 Park Avenue, and later, from the Westchester Country Club to the north. To satisfy these needs, he leased  of space from Grand Central Terminal.

In 1923, Campbell commissioned Augustus N. Allen, an architect known for designing estates on Long Island and townhouses in Manhattan, to build an office in the leased space in Grand Central. He transformed a room into a 13th-century Florentine office with a hand-painted plaster of Paris ceiling and leaded windows. He installed 19th-century Italian chairs and tables, an art collection worth more than $1 million ($ today), and a massive desk from which he conducted business. One of the most striking features was a Persian carpet that took up the entire floor and was said to have cost $300,000. Campbell added a piano and pipe organ, and at night turned his office into a reception hall, entertaining 50 or 60 friends who came to hear famous musicians play private recitals.

After Campbell's death in 1957, the rug and other furnishings disappeared from his office and the space eventually became a signalman's office and later a closet at Grand Central, where transit police stored guns and other equipment. It also held a small jail, in the area of the present-day bar. The room was restored in 1999 and turned into a bar, today called The Campbell.

References

The Chief Executive, "From Corner to Community: Transformation of CEO Office Space," by Margie Goldsmith (August 2001)

1880 births
1957 deaths
20th-century American railroad executives